

The Oodnadatta Track is an unsealed  outback road in the Australian state of South Australia, connecting Marla in the north-west via Oodnadatta to Marree in the south-east. Along the way, the track passes the settlements of Oodnadatta and William Creek, the southern lake of the Kati Thanda-Lake Eyre National Park, and mound springs known as Freeling Springs, Strangways Springs, and The Bubbler and Blanche Cup (Wabma Kadarbu Mound Springs).

Some maps show Oodnadatta Track as route D95, which, under the extended Australian alphanumeric road numbering system, belongs to a D road, a category distinct from a C road. However, the D95 is not signposted, as the Department for Infrastructure and Transport has a policy of not marking unsealed roads.

History
The track follows a traditional Australian Aboriginal trading route. Along the Track are numerous springs feeding water from the Great Artesian Basin, the most accessible examples being the mound springs near Coward Springs (now in Wabma Kadarbu Mound Springs Conservation Park).  Later, because of the availability of water, the route was chosen for the steam-train powered Central Australia Railway, the original route of The Ghan.

It was also the route taken by the explorer John McDouall Stuart on his third expedition in 1859.  Remnants of the many railway sidings and bridges, the ruins of railway buildings, and Overland Telegraph Line repeater stations are located along the track – some of the best preserved are the Coward Springs Campground – complete with natural artesian spa and the abandoned Curdimurka railway siding.

Angle Pole is the point near Oodnadatta where the direction of the Telegraph Line changed to a more northerly direction.  It is near the Peake cattle station, also known as "The Peake", or Freeling Springs. The ruins of Peake telegraph station exist on the station today. Nearby Peake Creek was named after Edward John Peake by John McDouall Stuart in June 1859, hence Peake Station, which was acquired by Kidman Holdings in 1898.

The Track was named by Adam Plate of the Oodnadatta Progress Association in about 1980 to form a trilogy of unsealed tourist routes with the Birdsville and Strzelecki Tracks nearby. This Road has no major intersections.

Route
The Oodnadatta Track heads southeast from Marla to Oodnadatta, and then roughly follows the former Central Australia Railway further southeast, until meeting the sealed Outback Highway at Marree. The road's surface has been well maintained in recent years. In dry weather, the track is passable to most vehicles and caravans, but a four-wheel drive (4x4) vehicle gives a more comfortable journey, and is essential for driving the track during and after rain. Since the track is unsealed, the Government of South Australia recommends that users check whether it is open before departure.

Major junctions
Oodanadatta Track is entirely contained within the Outback Communities Authority local government area.

Gallery

See also
 Highways in Australia
 List of highways in South Australia

References

Further reading

External links
 
 

Highways in South Australia
Australian outback tracks
Far North (South Australia)